Hungarian Rhapsody No. 2 in C-sharp minor, S.244/2, is the second in a set of 19 Hungarian Rhapsodies by composer Franz Liszt, and is by far the most famous of the set.

In both the original piano solo form and in the orchestrated version this composition has enjoyed widespread use in animated cartoons. Its themes have also served as the basis of several popular songs.

Background

The Hungarian-born composer and pianist Franz Liszt was strongly influenced by the music heard in his youth, particularly Hungarian folk music, with its unique gypsy scale, rhythmic spontaneity and direct, seductive expression. These elements would eventually play a significant role in Liszt's compositions. Although this prolific composer's works are highly varied in style, a relatively large part of his output is nationalistic in character, the Hungarian Rhapsodies being an ideal example.

Composed in 1847 and dedicated to Count László Teleki, Hungarian Rhapsody No. 2 was first published as a piano solo in 1851 by Senff and Ricordi. Its immediate success and popularity on the concert stage led to an orchestrated version, arranged (together with five other rhapsodies) in 1857–1860 by the composer in collaboration with Franz Doppler, and published by Schuberth in 1874–1875. In addition to the orchestral version, the composer arranged a piano duet version in 1874, published by Schuberth the following year.

Offering an outstanding contrast to the serious and dramatic lassan, the following friska holds enormous appeal for audiences, with its simple alternating tonic and dominant harmonization, its energetic, toe-tapping rhythms, and breathtaking "pianistics".

Most unusual in this composition is the composer's invitation for the performer to perform a cadenza, although most pianists choose to decline the invitation. Marc-André Hamelin composed a cadenza that has since become famous for its originality, musicality and playfulness, and Sergei Rachmaninoff also wrote a famous cadenza for his interpretation. Liszt himself wrote several cadenzas for the piece, but they were rarely performed. Other pianists have arranged their own versions of the Rhapsody with changes beyond that of simply adding a cadenza, most notably Vladimir Horowitz in 1953.

Sources of the melodies 
The title of this rhapsody is slightly misleading, as the introductory theme is Romanian, rather than Hungarian. This theme was found in one of Liszt's Weimar sketchbooks. The other themes were taken from the German pianist Heinrich Ehrlich.

Form

The piece consists of two distinct sections.

The first is the lassan, with its brief introduction. Although beginning on the C-sharp major triad, C-sharp minor is soon established as the home key. From this point on, the composer modulates freely, particularly to the tonic major and the relative major. The mood of the lassan is generally dark and melancholic, although it contains some playful and capricious moments.

The second section is the friska. It opens quietly in the key of F-sharp minor, but on its dominant chord, C-sharp major, recalling a theme from the lassan. The alternating dominant and tonic harmonies quickly increase in volume, the tempo gaining momentum as the Friska's main theme (in F-sharp major) is approached. At this point, the Friska begins its journey of ever-increasing energy and pianistic bravura, still underpinned by alternating tonic and dominant harmonies. Modulations are limited almost exclusively to the dominant (C-sharp major) and the lowered mediant (A major). Before the final whirlwind of sound, a moment of calm prevails in the key of F-sharp minor, recalling another of the lassan's themes, and is followed by the instruction, Cadenza ad lib. Finally, in the key of F-sharp major, there is a crescendo of prestissimo octaves, which ascend and then descend to cover almost the entire range of the keyboard and bringing the Rhapsody to a conclusion.

Liszt planned his choice of keys in a remarkably symmetrical fashion. Although the lassan's principal key is C-sharp minor (with the appropriate key signature used throughout) the work opens on the tonic major chord, C-sharp major. However, by bar 6, the minor tonality is established. This device provides a contrast which intensifies the generally dark and sombre character of the lassan. This procedure is directly reversed in the Friska. Although the principal key of the Friska is F-sharp major, Liszt chooses to begin in the tonic minor key, F-sharp minor, which is sustained until bar 51. For practical reasons of notation (i.e., the prolongation of the tonic minor key), Liszt chooses the key signature of F-sharp minor, until the arrival of the main theme in F-sharp major. This time, the use of the more serious minor tonality is used as a contrast to the arrival of the playful and jubilant main theme of the Friska.

Arrangements
The orchestral version of the Rhapsody produced by Liszt and Doppler is scored for an orchestra consisting of piccolo, two flutes, two oboes, two clarinets in B and A (doubling on the piccolo clarinet and clarinet in D), two bassoons, four horns in F, two trumpets in D, three trombones, timpani, bass drum, cymbals, triangle, glockenspiel, harp, and strings, and is raised by a semitone to D minor / G major. Another orchestral arrangement, one semitone below (C minor / F major), by Karl Müller Berghaus, also exists.

In 1933, Franz Schreker made an orchestral transcription, the performance of which was originally intended to be filmed as part of a series entitled Das Weltkonzert. This arrangement is published by Universal Edition.

In 1975, Gábor Szabó played a jazz rendition of the composition for his album Macho.

In popular culture

The Hungarian Rhapsody No. 2 has been prominently used in animated cartoons and popular media, most famously in the Tom and Jerry short The Cat Concerto, which won an Academy Award for Best Short Subject: Cartoons and the Bugs Bunny short Rhapsody Rabbit, directed by Friz Freleng. In 1941, five years before Rhapsody Rabbit, Freleng had directed Rhapsody in Rivets. 

The first such appearance in a cartoon was as part of a piano solo by Mickey Mouse in The Opry House in 1929 where he has to deal with an animated piano, and the second cartoon which did it was Bars and Stripes, another full orchestral version was featured in the Fleischer cartoon A Car-Tune Portrait. 
With a different set of lyrics, Hungarian Rhapsody became the Capitol children's record "Daffy Duck's Rhapsody", sung by Mel Blanc in his Daffy Duck persona, and still another cartoon connection for the rhapsody. Walter Lantz also gave Woody Woodpecker a chance to perform the piece in Convict Concerto, in which Woody tries to tune a piano under the aim of a bank robber's gun. It was used in some other Lantz cartoons before that, such as The Candy House, The Athlete and Pin Feathers.

In 1945, José Iturbi played this piece in the film Anchors Aweigh (1945). Jack Carson and Doris Day sing "Freddy Get Ready" to the tune of the piece in My Dream Is Yours (1949) along with Bugs Bunny. In the film Who Framed Roger Rabbit, director Robert Zemeckis pays tribute to "Number 2"'s cartoon heritage by using the piece for the "dueling pianos" scene featuring Daffy Duck and Donald Duck. Warner Brothers also used it again in the Tiny Toon Adventures episode C Flat or B Sharp?, in which Buster Bunny, Plucky Duck and Hamton must take the piano that is on top of the Acme Looniversity's main tower to the concert room, following the orders of Yosemite Sam. The soundtrack of this episode is a shorter version of the composition, and no lines are spoken. 

Victor Borge played the Hungarian Rhapsody No. 2 on The Muppet Show with Rowlf the Dog. He also played a duo version with Şahan Arzruni, in which they played on the same piano, and changed the parts to make it fun to the viewers. On Sesame Street, the tune was used in the song "The Curious Cantata", and it was sung by Luis, Maria, Bob and Big Bird. 

The final scenes of the 1982 cult film documentary The Atomic Cafe feature the rhapsody as the accompaniment to a nuclear war. It was used during, and at the finale of, the 2014 Hungarian film White God.

References

 Eric Blom ed.: "Grove's Dictionary of Music and Musicians"", 5th edition; St. Martin's Press, New York, 1954; Library of Congress Catalog Number 54-11819
 James Friskin and Irwin Freundlich: "Music for the Piano", Dover Publications, Inc., New York, 1973; 
 John Gillespie: "Five Centuries of Keyboard Music", Dover Publications, Inc., New York, 1972;

External links

 
 Free sheet music from Cantorion.org
 Hungarian Rhapsody #2, Lassan & Friska CC-licensed free recording from archive.org

02
1847 compositions
Compositions in C-sharp minor